Salon Kitty is a 1976 erotic-war-drama film directed by Tinto Brass. The film was coproduced by Italy, France and West Germany. It is based on the novel of the same name by Peter Norden, covering the real life events of the Salon Kitty operation, under which the Sicherheitsdienst took over an expensive brothel in Berlin, had the place wire tapped, and replaced all the prostitutes with trained spies, in order to gather information on various members of the Nazi party and foreign dignitaries.

It is considered among the progenitors of Nazisploitation genre.

In the U.S., the film was edited to lighten the political overtones for an easier marketing as a sexploitation film and released under the title Madam Kitty with an X rating.  Blue Underground Video, for the uncut version, has surrendered the X rating for an unrated DVD and Blu-ray release.

Plot 
Wallenberg (Helmut Berger), an ambitious Nazi SS commandant, devises a plan to select a special group of female informants in order to plant them as prostitutes in a high class brothel on the eve of World War II in order to collect intelligence on various important members of the Nazi party and foreign dignitaries who frequent the establishment. The selected SS auxiliaries are then group tested with SS men to assess their suitability. The brothel is then purged of its regular girls and Kitty (Ingrid Thulin), the owner and Madam of the brothel, is forced to comply and allows her original girls to be deported as the building gets wiretapped with listening devices and other surveillance equipment, after which the new girls proceed to spy on their illustrious clients. However, when one of the informants named Margherita (Teresa Ann Savoy) discovers that the surveillance project resulted in the execution of her lover, Luftwaffe pilot, Hans Reiter (Bekim Fehmiu), she enlists Kitty to help her take down Wallenberg. Margherita entraps Wallenberg via a recording where he tells her that he has the dirt on all the top Nazi hierarchy and intends to bring them all down. As a consequence, Wallenberg is executed for treason.

Cast 

The film also includes a large number of uncredited actors.

Production
Salon Kitty was filmed mostly at Dear Studios in Rome, with some additional location filming in Germany. Production designer Ken Adam had recently suffered a nervous breakdown while working on Barry Lyndon, and he described his participation in this film as creatively regenerative. He has stated that the production was enjoyable, and that he feels Salon Kitty is "underrated." Adam based his design of Wallenberg's apartment on his own memories of his family's apartment in World War II-era Berlin. Wallenberg's enormous office, though a set, allegedly features a real marble floor, as it was cheaper to use real marble than create a mock-up version.

Costumes and uniforms for the film were designed by Ugo Pericoli and Jost Jacob, and were constructed by Tirelli Costumi of Rome. Adam credited Jacob with the design of the 'kinky' uniforms that Wallenberg wears throughout the film.

Release and reception
Salon Kitty was released in Italy on March 2, 1976.

In a review at the time of the UK release, the Monthly Film Bulletin found the film to contain "a script that does nothing more than pile up the perversions as fast as possible (the characterisation hardly rises above the stock Nazi heavy while the motivation is consistently, and laughably, crude)" and hoped that "Italian directors will soon examine their recent track record of the atrocities of Nazi Germany (The Damned, The Night Porter, and now Salon Kitty) and abandon the subject for a long while to come."

See also 
 List of Italian films of 1976

References

External links

1976 films
1970s erotic drama films
1970s spy drama films
1976 LGBT-related films
Italian erotic drama films
French erotic drama films
German erotic drama films
Italian spy drama films
French spy drama films
German spy drama films
West German films
1970s Italian-language films
English-language Italian films
English-language French films
English-language German films
Nazi exploitation films
Films directed by Tinto Brass
Films set in Berlin
Films set in the 1940s
Films about Nazi Germany
World War II films based on actual events
Films about prostitution in Germany
1970s war drama films
French war drama films
German war drama films
Italian war drama films
1976 drama films
French World War II films
German World War II films
Italian World War II films
Films scored by Fiorenzo Carpi
1970s Italian films
1970s French films
1970s German films